Soviet submarine B-470 may refer to one of the following submarines of the Soviet Navy:

Russian Navy ship names
Soviet Navy ship names